Kevin Cossette (born January 9, 1990) is a Canadian soccer player who plays for Première Ligue de soccer du Québec club Royal-Sélect de Beauport.

Early life
Cossette was born in Greenfield Park, Quebec and grew up in Saint-Hyacinthe, Quebec. He played for numerous amateur and youth teams between 2002 and 2007, including Inter St-Hyacinthe, Cosmos Granby AAA, FC Sélect Rive-Sud AAA and Champlain College AAA.

Club career
He played for Montreal Impact's junior affiliate, Trois-Rivières Attak, in the Canadian Soccer League in 2009, scoring 3 goals in 18 games, prior to formally joining the Montreal Impact Academy in 2010.

Cossette was called up to the senior Montreal Impact squad in the summer of 2010, and made his debut for the team on July 3, 2010 in a game against the Rochester Rhinos. He attended preseason with the club in 2011, but was released at the very end of the camp, failing to make the 2011 roster.

In 2011, he decided to go to university attending Université Laval, where he played for the soccer team. Starting in 2013, he played with  Royal-Sélect de Beauport in the Ligue de Soccer Elite Quebec, the top amateur division in Quebec.

After graduating in 2015, he attended tryouts with USL clubs Rochester Rhinos and Pittsburgh Riverhounds SC, before ultimately signing with Louisville City FC. He became the first Laval graduate to sign a professional soccer contract. After the season, he received a contract offer from Pittsburgh, however, due to the low salary, he instead returned to his home in Quebec and re-joined Beauport.

In 2017, he joined Dynamo de Quebec in the semi-professional Première Ligue de soccer du Québec. In 2020, after Dynamo left the PLSQ, he joined AS Blainville.

Coaching career
He served as the technical director of the Mistral Laurentien SC beginning in 2016 and then in 2020 took the same position with the Richelieu Valley club.

References

External links
 Trois Riviere Attak bio

1990 births
Living people
Association football midfielders
Canadian soccer players
Soccer people from Quebec
Sportspeople from Longueuil
Sportspeople from Saint-Hyacinthe
Canadian expatriate soccer players
Expatriate soccer players in the United States
Canadian expatriate sportspeople in the United States
Trois-Rivières Attak players
Montreal Impact U23 players
Montreal Impact (1992–2011) players
Louisville City FC players
Canadian Soccer League (1998–present) players
USSF Division 2 Professional League players
USL Championship players
Première ligue de soccer du Québec players
Dynamo de Quebec players
FC Sélect Rive-Sud players
A.S. Blainville players
Royal-Sélect de Beauport players